Call of the Jungles was a TEFI-awarded Russian children's game show created and hosted by Sergei Suponev. Was aired on Wednesdays on Channel One. Later it was hosted by Pyotr Fyodorov Sr. for 1999, and Nikolai Gadomsky between 1999 and 2000. Music for the show was composed by Viktor Prudkovsky and Sergei Suponev performed the opening theme music "Djungli Zovut" (lit. "Jungles Are Calling").

The contestants were split into two teams of four called "The Predators" and "The Herbivores." Each player was associated with an animal, printed on their T-shirt which included, for the Predators, a crocodile, lion, panther and a leopard. The Herbivores team consisted of an elephant, panda, koala and a monkey.

External links
 Zov Djungley at the Channel One (in Russian).

Channel One Russia original programming
1993 Russian television series debuts
2000 Russian television series endings
Children's game shows
Russian game shows
Russian children's television series
1990s Russian television series
2000s Russian television series